Jainism is an ancient Indian religion belonging to the śramaṇa tradition. It prescribes ahimsa (non-violence) towards all living beings to the greatest possible extent. The three main teachings of Jainism are ahimsa, anekantavada (non-absolutism), aparigraha (non-possessiveness). Followers of Jainism take five main vows: ahimsa, satya (not lying), asteya (non stealing), brahmacharya (chastity), and aparigraha. Monks follow them completely whereas śrāvakas (householders) observe them partially. Self-discipline and asceticism are thus major focuses of Jainism.

Before common era (BCE)
 584,979–574,979 BCE: Naminatha, 21st Tirthankara
 Neminatha, 22nd Tirthankara: According to Jain beliefs, he lived 84,650 years before the 23rd Tirthankara, Parshvanatha. He existed in the Mahabharata era and was the cousin brother of Krishna.
 877–777 BCE: Parshvanatha, 23rd Tirthankar of Jainism. He is the earliest Jain tirthankara who can be reliably dated.
 599–527 BCE: Mahavira, 24th and last Tirthankar of this era.
 5th century BCE: Acharya shree Siddhasen Diwakar
 d. 507 BCE: Ganadhar Sudharma Swami
 d. 357 BCE: Acharya Bhadrabahu
 d. 162 BCE: Hathigumpha inscription mentions the Namokar Mantra and Jain monarch Kharvela.
 2nd century BCE: Namokar Mantra epigraphically attested in Maharashtra

Common era (CE)

1st century CE: Acharya Kundkund
87 CE: Pushpadanta starts to write Shatkhandagam
156 CE: Acharya Bhutabali completes writing of Shatkhandagam
454 CE: Devardhigani compiles Jain Agamas
5th century CE: first mention of the Mula Sangh order
 5th century CE: Pataini temple, Kahaum pillar and Kanakagiri Jain tirth were constructed

Middle Ages
 9th century
 The Tirumalai complex in Tamil Nadu is established.
 10th century
 Life of Nemichandra, a famous Jain author.
 Jain temple of Gurjiwada, Cudnem, Bicholim, Goa was constructed.
 982:  Monolithic statue of Bahubali erected at Shravana belagola
 12th century
 Kashtha Sangh
 1172: Acharya Hemachandra
 1194: Tristutik
 13th century
 1229: Tapa Gachchha
 15th century
 Ancient Jain temple of Gurjiwada, Cudnem, Bicholim, Goa was in ruins.
 17th century
 1664: Digambar Terapanth
 1658: Digambara Jain Lal Mandir temple in Delhi built.
 18th century
 1760: Swetembar Terapanth
 1780: Sthanakvasi and Terapanthi orders

British India
 1868: Jain temple in Mumbai
 1880s: reform movement of Acharya Rajendrasuri
 1893: Virachand Gandhi participates in Chicago's World Parliament of Religions& Won Silver Medal.
 1904: Jain temple at the Louisiana Purchase Exposition
1927: Madras High Court in Gateppa v. Eramma and others recognizes "Jainism as a distinct religion"

Post-Partition
 1970s: significant presence of Jainism in the United States
 1972: Aacharya Shri Vidyasagar Maharaj elevated to the Acharya status.
 1975: Acharya Sushil Kumar (Jain monk) ji travels to USA. The first Jain muni to travel by air out of the Indian subcontinent. 
 1975: Monolithic statue of Bahubali is installed at Dharmasthala, Karnataka, India under the auspices of D. Rathnavarma Heggade and Mathrushree D. Rathnamma Heggade, members of Dharmasthala's Jaina lineage who also manage the local Shivaite temple. Carving work began in 1966 under the sculptor Rejala Gopalkrishna Shenoy of Karkala.
 1976: In Arya Samaj Education Trust, Delhi & Others v. The Director of Education, Delhi Administration, Delhi & Others (AIR 1976 Delhi 207),  the Court referred to Heinrich Zimmer's Philosophies of India describing Jainism as  "a heterodox Indian religion" and J. N. Farquhar's Modern Religious Movements in India describing Jainism as "a rival of Hinduism."
 1981: First Jain convention in Los Angeles
 1983: Formal organization of JAINA (Jain Associations in North America)
 1990: Temple Pratishtha, The Jain Sangh Cherry Hill, New Jersey
 1990: Temple Pratishtha, Jain Society of Metropolitan Washington
 1991: Founding of Siddhachalam, the Jain tirtha
 1991: Death of Jain Acharya Shri Ramchandra Surishwarji 
 1993: Temple Pratishtha, Jain Society of Metropolitan Chicago
 1995: Temple Pratishtha, Jain Center of Cincinnati and Dayton
 1998: Temple Pratishtha, Jain Society of Greater Detroit
 2000: Temple Pratishtha, Jain Center of Northern California (JCNC)
 2000: Jain Vishwa Bharati Orlando
 2005: the Supreme Court of India declined to grant Jains the status of a religious minority throughout India, leaving it to the respective states to decide on the minority status of Jainis.
 2006: the Supreme Court opined that "Jain Religion is indisputably not a part of the Hindu religion" (Para 25, Committee of Management Kanya Junior High School Bal Vidya Mandir, Etah, U.P. v. Sachiv, U.P. Basic Shiksha Parishad, Allahabad, U.P. and Ors., Per Dalveer Bhandari J., Civil Appeal No. 9595 of 2003, decided On: 21.08.2006, Supreme Court of India.)
 2008: Delhi city government declares Jain community a minority per the Supreme Court Orders.
 2014: Jain community is designated a minority at the national level.

See also

  History of Jainism
 Jain philosophy
 Śramaṇa

Notes

References

External links
History & Evolution of Sramanic Jain Culture- Bal Patil
Antiquity of Jainism - Jain, Mahavir Saran

 Timeline
Timeline
Jainism